Sierra de Santa Cruz may refer to:

Sierra de Santa Cruz (Guatemala), a mountain range in Guatemala
Sierra de Santa Cruz, Aragon, a mountain range in the Iberian System, Aragon, Spain
Sierra de Santa Cruz (Extremadura), a mountain range near Trujillo, Extremadura, Spain